A tablespace is a storage location where the actual data underlying database objects can be kept.  It provides a layer of abstraction between physical and logical data, and serves to allocate storage for all DBMS managed segments. (A database segment is a database object which occupies physical space such as table data and indexes.) Once created, a tablespace can be referred to by name when creating database segments.

Tablespaces specify only the database storage locations, not the logical database structure, or database schema.  For instance, different objects in the same schema may have different underlying tablespaces.  Similarly, a tablespace may service segments for more than one schema. Sometimes it can be used to specify schema so as to form a bond between logical and physical data.

By using tablespaces, an administrator also can control the disk layout of an installation. A common use of tablespaces is to optimize performance. For example, a heavily used index can be placed on a fast SSD. On the other hand, a database table which contains archived data that is rarely accessed could be stored on a less expensive but slower magnetic hard drive.

While it is common for tablespaces to store their data in a filesystem file, a single file must be part of a single tablespace. Some database management systems allow tablespaces to be configured directly over operating-system device entries, called raw devices, providing better performance by avoiding the OS filesystem overheads.

Oracle stores data logically in tablespaces and physically in datafiles associated with the corresponding tablespace.

References 

Database management systems